Săliște River may refer to the following rivers in Romania:

 Săliște, a tributary of the Valea Mare in Cluj County
 Săliște, a tributary of the Globu in Caraș-Severin County